The 1950 Oklahoma gubernatorial election was held on November 7, 1950, and was a race for Governor of Oklahoma. Democrat  Johnston Murray defeated Republican Jo O. Ferguson. Phil Ferguson unsuccessfully sought the Democratic nomination.

Results

References

1950
Gubernatorial
Okla